Richard D. "Skip" Bronson is an American businessman and real estate developer. He is also the author of War At The Shore: Steve Wynn, Donald Trump and the Epic Battle to Save Atlantic City.

Early life and education
Bronson was born and raised in Hartford, Connecticut, the son of a window dresser at the G. Fox & Co. department store in Hartford. He was of Jewish descent. He started out as an insurance salesman at the Travelers Insurance Company.

Career
His career in real estate began when Carl Bennett, the founder of Caldor, tasked him with developing a satellite store in Brookfield, Connecticut. And he went on to develop numerous strip malls throughout the region culminating with the 38-story CityPlace I in Hartford, Connecticut's tallest building. At 1.2 million square feet and 38 stories, it is the largest and tallest office building in the state.

Since 2000, Mr. Bronson has been the Chairman of The Bronson Companies, LLC, a real estate development, investment and advisory company based in Beverly Hills, California. For more than thirty years, Mr. Bronson has been involved in the development of  commercial properties throughout the United States.

Mr. Bronson serves as a Director of Starwood Property Trust (NYSE: STWD), the largest commercial mortgage real estate investment trust in the United States where he has been the company's Lead Independent Director since its inception in 2009.

He is also a Director of Starwood Real Estate Income Trust, a non-traded REIT focused on the acquisition of commercial properties in the US and Europe.

Additionally he is a board member at Invitation Homes (NYSE: INVH).  Based in Dallas, the company is the largest owner of single‑family homes in America.

Previously he was the President of New City Development, an affiliate of Mirage Resorts, where he oversaw the company's new business initiatives and activities outside of Nevada. He was also a Board Member of Mirage Resorts and is a former Director of TRI Pointe Group, Inc. (NYSE: TPH), a homebuilder based in Irvine, California.

He has also served as a Trustee and Vice President of the International Council of Shopping Centers (ICSC), an association representing 70,000 industry professionals in more than 100 countries.

Mr. Bronson serves on the advisory board of the Neurosurgery Division at UCLA Medical Center in Los Angeles.  He and his wife Edie Baskin Bronson were the recipients of the department's  2018 "Visionary Award”.  

He is a past Trustee of The Forman School in Litchfield, CT  and is a past chairman of the Board of The Archer School for Girls in Los Angeles.

A frequent guest on CNN, CNBC, MSNBC and Bloomberg TV he is also the best-selling author of “The War at the Shore” which chronicles the complexities of the real estate development process.

Other ventures
Bronson was a founding partner in Monitor Productions, a joint venture with Main Events.  Monitor Productions was a sports promotion company that developed the careers of boxers, including 1984 Olympic gold medal winners Mark Breland, Pernell Whitaker, Meldrick Taylor, and the former heavyweight champion Evander Holyfield. The company promoted "Battle of the Ages" in 1991, a boxing event featuring George Foreman and Holyfield, which set a pay-per-view record and grossed over $80 million.

Wynn and Donald Trump Atlantic City dispute
Bronson worked with the New Jersey Governor's Office on their initiative to build the Atlantic City–Brigantine Connector, a $330 million road leading to a planned Mirage resort, in spite of the objections of Mirage's competitors, including Donald Trump. The dispute between Mirage and the Trump Organization escalated into a lawsuit and extensive legal battle. Construction was completed in 2001. The legal dispute between Wynn and Trump, including Bronson's involvement, are detailed in Bronson's best-selling book The War at the Shore: Steve Wynn, Donald Trump and the Epic Battle to Save Atlantic City. In spite of the dispute, Trump and Bronson became friends, with the help of the late Edward S. Gordon, founder of ESG, a commercial brokerage firm in New York City.

Personal life
He is married to Edie Baskin Bronson, daughter of Burt Baskin and stepdaughter of Isadore Familian.

References

1940s births
Living people
American real estate businesspeople
Year of birth missing (living people)
American people of Jewish descent
Baskin-Robbins family